HMAS Shoalwater (M 81), named for Shoalwater Bay in Queensland, was a Bay class minehunter of the Royal Australian Navy.

She was built by Carrington Slipways at its Ramsay Fibreglass facility in Tomago, New South Wales, launched on 20 June 1987 and commissioned on 10 October 1987. During her sea trials, Shoalwater travelled to Townsville where a number of charges were detonated around the vessel to test her tolerance to underwater explosions. Shoalwater performed above expectations during these tests. For the duration of her service with the RAN, Shoalwater was assigned to HMAS Waterhen in Sydney, where the Navy established a Mine Warfare Systems Centre ahead of the Bay class ships entering service.

Shoalwater was decommissioned on 14 August 2001. She and sister ship  were sold in 2002 for service in the Persian Gulf.

References

 

Bay-class minehunters
Ships built in New South Wales
1987 ships